Desapatrunipalem is a suburb situated in  Visakhapatnam City, India. The area, which falls within the local administrative limits of Greater Visakhapatnam Municipal Corporation, is quite close to the Visakhapatnam Steel Plant site. Desapatrunipalem is a pleasant residential colony, well connected with Gajuwaka, and has experienced a real estate boom, it is one of the fastest developing suburbs in visakhapatnam. the place is famous for its industry oriented suburb as it is one of the main connections of Jawaharlal Nehru Pharma City and NTPC Limited and Rashtriya Ispat Nigam and APSEZ. and it is one of the main destination of employees of various PSU employees.

References

Neighbourhoods in Visakhapatnam